Coal House is a Welsh television series made by Indus Films for BBC Wales, and broadcast on BBC One Wales, with a subsequent UK wide repeat of both series on BBC Four. Series 1 was set in the depressed economic coalfields of 1927, while Series 2 was set in 1944 as World War II draws to a close. Series 2 was broadcast on BBC across the UK from October 2009

Plot
The series follows three or more families who are placed in a location which replicates the lifestyle of Welsh people living in a coal mining town of that period. The chosen families leave all 21st century luxuries behind, swapping a modern high-tech life for a miner's cottage in Stack Square in the Welsh hills of Blaenavon.  The mines are owned by Mr. Blanford, and are  up the hills.  Men and boys over the age of 14 are required to work in the mines.

Production

Series 1
Filmed from early October 2007 and shown from late October 2007, three families (the Cartwright family from Penarth, the Griffiths family from Ceredigion; and the Phillips family from the Vale of Glamorgan), cope with daily life as the Welsh mining community lived it 80 years ago - a year after the last general strike and before the pits were nationalised.

For the men and boys over 14 there was the harsh reality of long walks to work over mountains in all weather, to face a long day as coal miners at Blaentillery No.2 Mine - the last working mine of its kind in the UK. Meanwhile, the women had to run the home under 1927 conditions, keeping the children fed, watered and clean. Even making a cup of tea involved the hard work of collecting water from a pump and lighting a fire.

A special hour-length final episode was recorded which included footage from a Hunger March Concert held at Park Street Chapel, Blaenafon.  Blaenavon Male Voice Choir took part in the concert, along with members of the Coal House families who sang and recited verse.

Series 2
Series 2, titled Coal House at War, was filmed in October 2008 in the same Blaenavon location, but set in 1944.

Three families - the Griffiths family from Ammanford, the Paisey family from Cardiff, and the Tranter Davies family from Merthyr Tydfil - live life as it was in a mining community during World War II. In an attempt to gain an insight into how people lived during the war, they swapped a hectic twenty-first century life for a more simplified way of living.

As in the first series, the men - and boys aged over fourteen - had to work a long day as coal miners at Blaentillery No. 2 Mine. Once again, they have to cope with the demands of the mine owner, Mr Blanford. The men of the family were also expected to do their duty in the Home Guard after a long day underground. Mines were considered a target, so inclusion in the Home Guard was vital. The women had to run the home under 1944 conditions, which included war work and feeding their families with limited rations. The families were joined by evacuees and Bevin Boys, who were conscripted to fight and then sent to dig for coal.

Setting
The series is filmed mostly on location in period cottages at Stack Square, Blaenavon.  The Stack Square cottages were built between 1789 and 1792 to house part of the Blaenavon Ironworks workforce.

Coal House Diary
In 2008, Gwen Cartwright, a 12-year-old participant in series one, published her diary of her experience – Coal House Diary.

See also
 The 1900 Island

Gallery

References

External links
 
  Living History group who played the part of the Home Guard

2000s British reality television series
BBC Cymru Wales television shows
2007 British television series debuts
2008 British television series endings
Historical reality television series
2000s Welsh television series
Blaenavon
Television shows set in Wales